George Shrinks is a children's animated television series. It is based on the children's book by the well-known author William Joyce, produced in China by Jade Animation and Canadian studio Nelvana, in association with PBS. The show premiered as part of the "Bookworm Bunch" block on September 30, 2000 and ended with the final episode on January 23, 2003.

Plot
The show tells the story of a small, 10-year-old boy named George who, one night dreams that he is three inches tall, only to wake up and discover that he actually shrunk in the night. The show details his navigating life with his friends and family as he solves problems using machines he and his father have created.

Content
George's tiny size turns mundane activities, such as working around the house or playing outside, into dramatic adventures. His primary mode of transportation is his Zoopercar, a multi-purpose miniature vehicle he built with his father that can do things like transform into a submarine, an airplane or a helicopter. George often has interesting encounters with animals who, although they don't talk, seem to be able to communicate with George throughout the series. On one occasion, he encountered a robotic alien that was his own size and helped it get back home.

The show affects a retro-1950s look, with simple animation and colours, similar to Warner Bros. Animation's Superman: The Animated Series. Primarily jazz is used for background music and music cues, reflecting both his father's occupation as a musician who tinkers with inventing new musical instruments and his mother's style as an avant-garde artist. However, statements made in the characters' dialogue indicate that events take place in the present, or the year that the showing episode was produced and animated.

The theme song, composed by Roberto Occhipinti, in a jumping blues style, is sung by Canadian musician Colin James.

One main difference from the book and the show is that in the book, George turns back to normal size by the end-his small stature lasting only a day while his parents are out (it could've all been a dream as well, as it is not explained how he turns back). In the show, George appears to be permanently small with no statement, appearing big in one episode (which was a dream).

Characters

Main
 George Bernard Shrinks (voiced by Tracey Moore) is the 10-year-old titular protagonist of the series, who wakes up from a dream to discover he is small; his golden plated baby shoes were completely tiny seen in "Round Up the Usual Insects". Because of his small stature, George has had to invent his own adaptive devices, most notably the Zoopercar (a small vehicle which George built with his father, and which can be automatically transformed into an airplane, a helicopter, or a submarine). Another invention is a system of pneumatic tubes, which George also uses for transportation.
 Harold Shrinks Jr. (referred to as "Junior" in the show) (voiced by Robbi Jay Thuet) is George's little brother, who often accompanies George in his adventures around the house. Junior is George's "sidekick" and "gofer", doing the tasks that are too difficult for George because of the latter's stature. However, his playfulness and his size sometimes lead to accidents, though Junior's sincere "Sowwy, George", always gets his brother to forgive him.
 Rebecca "Becky" Lopez (voiced by Bryn McAuley) is George's Latina best friend who lives next door. She and George go on many exploits and adventures. Becky is the captain for a Little League ice hockey team called, "The Storks", whose poorly bad-scoring drought was the focus of one of the later episodes.
 Perdita Shrinks (voiced by Kathleen Laskey) is George and Harold Junior's mother, a freelance artist by trade who builds, sculpts and welds with a very abstract style. She is a member of the town's art committee and is into healthy foods. She is also very supportive of the projects that the family and kids work on, and enjoys helping out in the community. She also used to be a Radio City Rockette which George reveals his father told him in the episode "If It Ain't Broke".
 Harold Shrinks Sr. (voiced by Paul O'Sullivan) is George and Junior's father, a musician in a jazz band who is constantly building and trying out new instruments (most of which resemble oversized and distorted tubas and saxophones) in the search for the "perfect sound". Harold is a little eccentric, but still loves his family and is a good father.

Others and one-time characters
 Aunt Eunice (voiced by Catherine Gallant) is George and Junior's great-aunt (but whom the whole family calls 'aunt'), who sometimes serves them as their babysitter. The first time she saw the boys, she was very patronizing toward George, treating him as though his size were a handicap and "assisting" him. However Aunt Eunice's ways have changed when George fixes her prized plant, a Bonsai tree "Maurice", which seemingly been damaged beyond repair. In "Return to Sender", she expresses complete confidence in that George will handle himself just fine when he was mailed to different locations across the planet, and that he could mail himself back home safely. She has travelled all over the world; as such, she knows a great deal about different places as well as people. The boys' mother, Perdita Shrinks, is Eunice's niece.
 Sparkle Tangerine l is a furry, bright orange stray cat that roams George's neighborhood, also the main antagonist. She often tries to eat George or anyone his size. A similar cat, though unnamed, appeared in the original book by William Joyce. Seen in some episodes: Can We Keep Him?, Close Encounters of the Bird Kind, Zoopercar Caper, King Kongo, George vs. the Space Invaders, Journey to the Centre of the Garden, Dog-Sitting Miss Daisy, The George-Lo-Phone, Return of the Space Invaders, Small of the Wild, Hound of the Bath-ervilles, George Unshrinks, If I Ran the Circus, Becky in Wonderland, and The Lost World of George Shrinks.
 Russell Copeland (voiced by Sean McCann) is a kind-hearted senior that used to live in George's house as a boy. He is also a retired veterinarian.
 Ellen (voiced by Lisa Yamanaka) is a kind-hearted girl next door of Chinese heritage. Despite only appearing in three episodes, Ellen plays a major role in two of them. Ellen is a fan of vintage horror movies and enjoys playing harmless practical jokes. She has an older brother, Matt, who is an owner of an anole lizard named Ting-Ting (which, as Ellen describes, has a literal meaning of "Gracefully Graceful" in the Chinese language). She is left-handed and a member of the Storks, Becky's hockey team, as a forward on the left wing.
 Timmy and Jimmy Fortevoce are identical twins, members of Becky's hockey team- Jimmy plays centre and Timmy plays defence. Despite appearing in just two episodes, they still play an important role as supporting members of the cast. In Italian, their last name means "Loud Voice".
 Hilda and Henry are two blonde-haired, glasses wearing dizygotic fraternal twins/sororal twins. They almost say anything in unison and only appeared in two episodes. They enjoy playing tricks on one another, such as during a scary movies night at the Shrinks' residence. They are somewhat competitive but are good friends with George and Becky.
 Helga (voiced by Maryke Hendrikse) is the goaltender for the Storks, Becky's Little League hockey team. Coach Shrinks is the only episode she appears in, which she plays a major role. She usually wears glasses, except on the ice because the lenses fog up. 
 Lizzy is right-wing forward for the Storks, Becky's Little League hockey team. She's skilled at turning on the spot because of her past experience figure skating; she joined the hockey team because she thought it was kind of lonely and wanted to join the team. She only appears in the episode, Coach Shrinks.
 The Cadwells appear only in the episode, "Speed Shrinks". These kids are two twins similar to Hilda and Henry, but are somewhat villainous. They build a craft similar to the SR-71 Blackbird and use its special features to destroy and unfairly halt the other racers in order to win. The boy is voiced by Michael Cera and the girl is voiced by Annick Obonsawin.
 Skyler is George and Junior's first cousin once removed. Seen only in "Toy George". She is about the same age as Junior and has similar personalities to him. She attended the school play which George was putting on, "Pinocchio".

Episodes

Series overview

Season 1 (2000)

Season 2 (2001)

Season 3 (2003)

Telecast
The show premiered on September 30, 2000 on PBS Kids as part of the Bookworm Bunch block. The block was discontinued at the end of 2004, but the show was given an individual PBS debut on January 6, 2003, along with The Berenstain Bears and Maurice Sendak's Seven Little Monsters. Repeats continued to air on PBS Kids until 2009. As of 2009, the show has never aired again in the U.S.

In Canada, the show aired on CBC, TVO, and YTV.

Internationally, the show aired on ABC Kids in Australia and Milkshake! in the United Kingdom.

Home media

Treehouse Direct also released the series on YouTube.

References

External links
 George Shrinks Episode Guide at Big Cartoon DataBase
 
 Retrojunk: George Shrinks

2000s Canadian children's television series
2000s Canadian animated television series
2000s Chinese television series
2000 Canadian television series debuts
2003 Canadian television series endings
2000 Chinese television series debuts
2003 Chinese television series endings
2000s preschool education television series
Canadian children's animated adventure television series
Canadian children's animated education television series
Canadian children's animated fantasy television series
Canadian television shows based on children's books
Chinese children's animated adventure television series
Chinese children's animated fantasy television series
English-language television shows
PBS original programming
PBS Kids shows
TVO original programming
YTV (Canadian TV channel) original programming
CBC Kids original programming
Animated television series about children
Animated television series about brothers
Animated television series about families
Animated television series about cats
Television series about size change
Television shows set in the United States
Television series by Nelvana